Johnston's Tavern, also known as the New Lodge Inn, is a historic inn and tavern located at Springfield Township, Mercer County, Pennsylvania.  It was built in 1831, and is a two-story, five bay wide fieldstone building with Greek Revival style design details.  It was one of the main stagecoach stops on the Pittsburgh-Erie Turnpike.  The tavern was a stop on the Underground Railroad.

It was added to the National Register of Historic Places in 1972.

References

Underground Railroad locations
Hotel buildings on the National Register of Historic Places in Pennsylvania
Greek Revival architecture in Pennsylvania
Hotel buildings completed in 1831
Buildings and structures in Mercer County, Pennsylvania
National Register of Historic Places in Mercer County, Pennsylvania